James L. "Jim" Mathewson (March 16, 1938 – September 27, 2021) was an American politician who served in the Missouri Senate and the Missouri House of Representatives.

Early life and education 
Born in Fristoe, Missouri, Mathewson graduated from public schools from Warsaw. He attended Redding Junior College (now Shasta College) and California State University, Chico.

Career 
He was the owner of a real estate appraisal firm and a broadcasting company. Matthewson served in the United States Army. He and his wife operated a restaurant until it was burned down in a fire. He served as a member of the Missouri House of Representatives from 1974 to 1978

and the Missouri Senate from 1980 to 2005.

Personal life 
His wife Doris H. Angel Mathewson, a native of Sedalia, Missouri, died June 14, 2017. They were married for more than 50 years.

References

1938 births
2021 deaths
20th-century American politicians
Democratic Party members of the Missouri House of Representatives
Democratic Party Missouri state senators
People from Benton County, Missouri